Antelope Center is an unincorporated community in the Antelope Valley of the western Mojave Desert, in northern Los Angeles County, California.

References

Unincorporated communities in Los Angeles County, California
Antelope Valley
Populated places in the Mojave Desert
Unincorporated communities in California